Musaabad (also Romanized as Mūsáābād; also known as Mūsīābād and Mussiābād) is a village in Garakan Rural District, in the Central District of Ashtian County, Markazi Province, Iran. At the 2006 census, its population was 336, in 82 families.

References 

Populated places in Ashtian County